Rūdininkai or Rūdninkai airbase is a former Soviet airbase in Lithuania located  southwest of Vilnius and only  from the border with Belarus. It is surrounded by Rūdininkai Forest, the fifth largest forest in Lithuania. Bomber pilots from various Soviet republics were trained to accurately bombard rows of obsolete military equipment, cars, tanks, even airplanes. Various explosives, usually air-dropped bombs weighing , are still found in the abandoned facility.

References

Lithuanian airbases
Military facilities of the Soviet Union in Lithuania
Buildings and structures in Vilnius County
Soviet Air Forces education and training